The Ljungström turbine (Ljungströmturbinen) is a steam turbine. It is also known as the STAL turbine, from the company name STAL. The technology has had numerous uses since its conception, from power plants to vehicles as large as the supertanker Seawise Giant.
 
It was invented circa 1908 by the Swedish brothers Birger Ljungström (1872–1948) and  Fredrik Ljungström (1875–1964). 
The Ljungström brothers were creative, versatile inventors, typical of the 19th century. They not only named the turbine type, but also an early form of a bicycle.

Functionality
The steam flows  through the machine in a radial direction from the centre to the outer extremities. The turbine consists of two halves that rotate against each other. As a result, each rotor blade of the one turbine half serves simultaneously as the guide blade of the other half. The different direction of rotation of the two halves is either compensated by a gearbox connected downstream or by separate generators if the turbine is used for the generation of electrical power. The Ljungström turbine can either be used with a condenser to recover the exhaust steam as condensate, or alternatively the exhaust can be utilised for the supply of a district heating grid, and thus the turbine is flexible in its application. It was therefore used in large industrial complexes, which could use the exhaust of this engine for both combined heat and power as well as its electric energy. The functionality has been employed for several power plants.

In principle, the maximum power possible is about 32 MW, since the diameter of the two turbine halves are limited to a practical size due to fabrication constraints. Coupled with a Parsons turbine, the output of a Ljungström turbine can be increased to about 50 MW. Since more modern steam power plants have a significantly higher performance, the Ljungström turbine is generally no longer utilised today. The largest ship ever built, the ULCC supertanker Seawise Giant, was powered by this type of engine.

Gallery

See also
 STAL
 Brush Electrical Machines
 Gio. Ansaldo & C.

Bibliography 
 Sigvard Strandh: '' Die Maschine: Geschichte, Elemente, Funktion. Ein enzyklopädisches Sachbuch", Herder Verlag, 1980.  (Ljungströmturbine, pp. 133–135, Svea-Bike, p. 220 and Fig. 221)

References

External links 

 Ljungströmturbine Tekniskamuseet
 Swedish innovations   Swedish Institute
 STAL-turbin till Tekniska Museet by Carl-Göran Nilson  
 Science Museum Group: Brush Ljungstrom radial-flow steam turbine
 Science Industry Musem: "Balance of power: The exceptional case of the Brush Ljungström Turbine"
 BRUSH electrical history ollection

Steam turbines
Swedish inventions
Ljungström